Lionel Rothschild may refer to:

 Lionel de Rothschild (1808–1879), the son of Nathan Mayer Rothschild
 Lionel de Rothschild (born 1882) (1882–1942), the eldest son of Leopold de Rothschild
 Lionel Walter Rothschild, 2nd Baron Rothschild (1868–1937), the eldest son of Nathan Rothschild, 1st Baron Rothschild